Marc M. Mouton (June 1, 1901 – August 30, 1944) served as Lieutenant Governor of Louisiana from 1940 until 1944 during the administration of Governor Sam Houston Jones. He graduated from the medical department of Tulane University in New Orleans, Louisiana.

He married Alice Campbell, daughter of Judge William Campbell. Mouton, a Democrat, was a resident of Lafayette, Louisiana, and died in the summer of 1944 shortly after vacating the office of lieutenant governor to J. Emile Verret of New Iberia.

References

Lieutenant Governors of Louisiana
Louisiana Democrats
1944 deaths
Sportspeople from Lafayette, Louisiana
1901 births
20th-century American politicians